La Pulquería is a Spanish punk rock band named for Pulque dispensaries.  They represent a fusion of ska, punk rock, mariachi, and Mexican rock.

Discography
 Corridos de amor (2004)
 C'mon fandango (2007)
 Hey Ho Chingón (Directo) (2008)
 Fast Cuisine, un menú de tres platos (2010)
 Everybody Arroz Arse
 Para To Take A Güey
 Dulce De Leches
 Lobo de bar (2016)

References

External links
Official site (Spanish only)

Spanish musical groups